Chrysophyllum imperiale is a tropical tree of the family Sapotaceae native to eastern South America. It is currently classified as an endangered species. Its fruits were very much appreciated by the first emperor of Brazil, Pedro I and his son Pedro II, who exported specimens of the tree as an offering to various botanical gardens around the world, including Sydney and Lisbon.

Distribution
It is endemic to the Atlantic Forest ecoregion of eastern Brazil, native to the vicinity of Rio de Janeiro. Most of its habitat has been erased by urbanisation and city spread. It is a component of lowland rainforest up to  altitude, where it grows to be a part of the canopy.

Description
They are smooth above and finely furred on the undersurface, and have a prominent midrib. The leaf margins are serrated, which is an unusual characteristic for the subfamily to which it belongs.

Taxonomy
This species was first described in 1859 as Theophrastia imperialis, before being given its current name by Joseph Dalton Hooker and George Bentham. It was also classified as Martusiella imperialis by French botanist J.B. Louis Pierre in 1891. It is known locally in Brazil as Marmelleiro do matto. In 1991 it was placed in section Aneuchrysophyllum of the genus Chrysophyllum, along with C. bangweolense and C. venezuelanense. However a combined DNA and morphological study of the subfamily Chrysophylloideae found the two main genera, Chrysophyllum and Pouteria, to be highly polyphyletic, and that C. imperiale is not closely related to other members of the genus but instead the genus Elaeoluma. The study authors recommend resurrecting the binomial name Martusiella imperialis pending further resolution of relationships within the subfamily.

Cultivation
An imposing specimen tree in the Royal Botanic Gardens, Sydney was planted by Prince Alfred, Duke of Edinburgh in 1868. Seeds from this plant have been sent to Rio de Janeiro to facilitate recovery of the species there. Three specimens are growing in the Royal Botanic Gardens in Melbourne.

It can be grown as a container plant.

References

External links

imperiale
Endemic flora of Brazil
Flora of the Atlantic Forest
Flora of Rio de Janeiro (state)
Endangered flora of South America
Plants described in 1859